Lukoil Macedonia is a subsidiary company of Lukoil in North Macedonia. The first gas station was open for service in 2006.

Recognition
Lukoil has recognized its subsidiary in Macedonia for best one in 2012 and 2013.

References

Companies of North Macedonia
Macedonian companies established in 2005
Energy companies of North Macedonia
Companies based in Skopje